

History
The Miss South Pacific pageant was established in 1987 by the Government of Samoa as a regional event to recognize and promote the attributes, intelligence and talents of Pacific Islands women, their contributions to regional affairs and their ability to advance in diverse fields. The first Miss South Pacific pageant was hosted in Western Samoa in 1987, and one of the representative from American Samoa, Juliette Spencer, was crowned as the first Miss South Pacific. Tahiti was the first nation in the pageant's history to win back-to-back victories, with Retire Chevaux winning in 1989 and Henari Arauvaa in 1990. Cook Islands has won the most titles, with 8 titles altogether within 22 years: the first win was by Kimiora Vogel in 1991, and the most recent was Teuira Napa in 2013. Samoa and American Samoa have each also had victorious representatives from their overseas communities, including Miss Samoa Hawaii, Theresa Purcell in 1988 and Miss Samoa NZ, Julia Toevai in 1992. Samoa started competing in the pageant as Western Samoa, and changed its name to Samoa in 1997. The pageant started off with about 20 contestants representing their homelands and their homeland communities overseas (such as Samoa Hawaii, Cook Islands NZ, Niue Australia, etc.) until the year 2000; from 2001 the pageant required South Pacific Islanders wishing to represent their homeland communities abroad to compete in and win their homeland pageants first in order to enter the Miss South Pacific Pageant; as a result the number of Miss South Pacific contestants dropped.

The pageant has been held in different Pacific island nations, as chosen by the pageant's board, and Samoa had hosted the most pageants, with more than 10 times. Many islands and territories that had previously competed have been absent from the pageant in some years, such as Aotearoa (New Zealand), Hawaiian Islands, Kiribati, New Caledonia, Niue, Northern Marianas, Rapa Nui, Tokelau and Vanuatu. Fiji won their first Miss South Pacific title in 2009 with Merewalesi Nailatikau and became the first Melanesian woman to captured the title. In 2014, the pageant was renamed Miss Pacific Islands in order to represent the entire Pacific Region instead of just the South Pacific. Teuira Napa of the Cook Islands was the last to reign as Miss South Pacific, and Latafale Auvaa of Samoa was the first to reign as Miss Pacific Islands. Auvaa was the only Miss Pacific Islands to hold multiple pageant titles during her reign which includes Miss Samoa NZ, Miss Samoa & Miss World Samoa. In 2015, Auvaa set out to compete for the 2015 Miss World pageant before the 2015 Miss Pacific Islands Pageant held at Rarotonga, Cook Islands, and the former Miss South Pacific 2013 Teuira Napa was given the honor to crown the 2015 Miss Pacific Islands, which was won by Abigail Havora winning the first Miss Pacific Islands title for Papua New Guinea.

For the first time in the Pageant’s History, the Miss Pacific Islands pageant for 2020 was cancelled due to the COVID-19 pandemic. The reigning Miss Pacific Islands 2019 Fonoifafo McFarland-Seumanu of Samoa will become the longest reigning Miss Pacific Islands to ever hold the title.

Title Holders

Country/Territory By Numbers Of Wins

Winners Gallery

Runners-up

References

1987 establishments in Oceania
1980s establishments in Samoa
Beauty pageants in Oceania
Beauty pageants for people of specific ethnic or national descents
International beauty pageants
Continental beauty pageants